Randall Scott Kirk (born December 27, 1964) is a former American football linebacker and special teams member who played thirteen seasons in the National Football League.  He is a 1983 graduate of Bellarmine College Prep where his team went undefeated and finished #1 in the state, and went on to play college football at San Diego State University.

1964 births
Living people
Players of American football from San Jose, California
American football linebackers
San Diego Chargers players
Arizona Cardinals players
San Francisco 49ers players
San Diego State Aztecs football players
National Football League replacement players